P2X purinoceptor 4 is a protein that in humans is encoded by the P2RX4 gene.
The product of this gene belongs to the family of purinoceptors for ATP. Multiple alternatively spliced transcript variants have been identified for this gene although their full-length natures have not been determined.

The receptor is found in the central and peripheral nervous systems, in the epithelia of ducted glands and airways, in the smooth muscle of the bladder, gastrointestinal tract, uterus, and arteries, in uterine endometrium, and in fat cells. P2X4 receptors have been implicated in the regulation of cardiac function, ATP-mediated cell death, synaptic strengthening, and activating of the inflammasome in response to injury.

Receptor structure and kinetics 
The P2X4 subunits can form homomeric or heteromeric receptors. The P2X4 receptor has a typical P2X receptor structure. The zebrafish P2X4 receptor was the first purinergic receptor to be crystallized and have its three-dimensional structure solved, forming the model for the P2X receptor family.  
The P2X4 receptor is a ligand-gated cation channel that opens in response to ATP binding. The P2X4 receptor has high calcium permeability, leading to the depolarization of the cell membrane and the activation of various Ca2+-sensitive intracellular processes. Continued binding leads to increased permeability to N-methyl-D-glucamine (NMDG+) in about 50% of the cells expressing the P2X4 receptor.  The desensitization of P2X4 receptors is intermediate when compared to P2X1 and P2X2 receptors.

Pharmacology

Agonists 
P2X4 receptors respond to ATP, but not αβmeATP.  These receptors are also potentiated by ivermectin, cibacron blue, and zinc.

Antagonists 
The main pharmacological distinction between the members of the purinoceptor family is the relative sensitivity to the antagonists suramin and pyridoxalphosphate-6-azophenyl-2',4'-disulphonic acid (PPADS). The product of this gene has the lowest sensitivity for these antagonists

Receptor trafficking 
P2X4 receptors are stored in lysosomes and brought to the cell surface in response to extracellular signals.  These signals include IFN-γ, CCL21, CCL2. Fibronectin is also involved in upregulation of P2X4 receptors through interactions with integrins that lead to the activation of SRC-family kinase member, Lyn. Lyn then activates PI3K-AKT and MEK-ERK signaling pathways to stimulate receptor trafficking. Internalization of P2X4 receptors is clathrin- and dynamin-dependent endocytosis.

Neuropathic pain 
The P2X4 receptor has been linked to neuropathic pain mediated by microglia in vitro and in vivo.  P2X4 receptors are upregulated following injury.  This upregulation allows for increased activation of p38 mitogen-activated protein kinases, thereby increasing the release of brain-derived neurotrophic factor (BDNF) from microglia.  BDNF released from microglia induces neuronal hyperexcitability through interaction with the TrkB receptor. More importantly, recent work shows that P2X4 receptor activation is not only necessary for neuropathic pain, but it is also sufficient to cause neuropathic pain.

See also 
 P2X receptor

References

Further reading

External links 
 

Ion channels